Joseph Hunter Guthrie  (January 8, 1901 – November 11, 1974) was an American academic philosopher, writer, Jesuit, and Catholic priest. Born in New York City, he entered the Society of Jesus in 1917, and began his studies at Woodstock College. Following his undergraduate and graduate work there, he taught at Jesuit institutions in the Philippines until 1927. Following his ordination in 1930, he received doctorates in theology and philosophy from the Pontifical Gregorian University and the University of Paris, respectively. He then returned to the United States, where he became a professor of philosophy at Woodstock College and Fordham University.

In 1943, Guthrie became the chairman of graduate philosophy at Georgetown University and dean of the Graduate School of Arts and Sciences. In this role, he admitted the first women to the school on equal terms as men. For twenty years, he promoted the belief that intellectuals must play a central role in combatting the ideologies that led to World War II. To that end, he was a member of the drafting committee of the UNESCO charter, was a co-founder of an American academy of Catholic intellectuals, and travelled the world with the U.S. State Department, for which he received honors from several countries and organizations.

Guthrie became the president of Georgetown University in 1949, and a major decision he made was to abolish the university's football program, believing it to be inconsistent with the educational purpose of a Catholic university. He also oversaw construction of McDonough Gymnasium. His tenure ended abruptly in 1952, when he did not return at the start of the academic year. His resignation resulted from illness, as well as frustration with senior administrators who resisted his attempts to centralize governance of the university. In his later years, he taught at Saint Joseph's College in Philadelphia, and died in Wernersville, Pennsylvania, in 1974.

Early life 
Joseph Hunter Guthrie was born on January 8, 1901, in New York City, to parents Jacob Francis Guthrie and Mary Guthrie (née Ross). He enrolled at Fordham Preparatory School in 1913, and graduated in 1917. On July 30 of that year, he entered the Society of Jesus at the novitiate of St. Andrew-on-Hudson. Guthrie began studying science and philosophy at Weston College in Massachusetts, and completed his undergraduate education at Woodstock College in Maryland, where he graduated in 1923 with a Bachelor of Arts and in 1924 with a Master of Arts. Guthrie then taught English, Latin, and rhetoric at the seminary in Vigan, in the Philippines, from 1924 to 1925, and English, Latin, and economics at the Ateneo de Manila University from 1925 to 1927. He also coached drama at both the Vigan Seminary and Ateneo, which resulted in his Ateneo Passion Play being performed in 1927 at the Manila Grand Opera House.

European studies 
Guthrie returned to Woodstock College that year, traveling through China, Japan, North Africa, and India on his return voyage. On June 23, 1930, he was ordained a Catholic priest at Woodstock. He was then sent to the Pontifical Gregorian University in Rome, where he earned a Doctor of Sacred Theology degree in 1931. He spent the following year studying ascetical theology at the Drongen Abbey and at the Catholic University of Louvain in Belgium. On August 15, 1934, he professed his final vows in the Chapel of Saint Denis on Montmartre in Paris, which were received by Anthony Joseph Schuler, the Bishop of El Paso, Texas.

Guthrie began work on his doctorate in philosophy, studying at the University of Berlin, the University of Munich, the University of Frieburg, and the University of Paris. During this time, he became ill with tuberculosis, which required that he be treated in Asheville, North Carolina. During his time in Europe, Guthrie studied under Martin Heidegger, Werner Jaeger, and Emile Brédier, and was closely acquainted with Edith Stein, Simone Weil, Jacques Maritain, and Étienne Gilson. He was also in contact with the Vienna Circle. As a result, his philosophical interests were German existentialism, logical positivism, and analytic philosophy, the latter of which he studied a decade before it become prominent in American universities.

Following his education, Guthrie taught philosophy at Woodstock College from 1937 to 1940. He became a professor and chairman of the department of graduate philosophy at Fordham University in 1940, remaining in the position for three years. He was also an assistant editor of The Journal of Philosophy, Thought, and Philosophy Abstracts, and was a prolific author.

Georgetown University

Deanship 
In 1943, Guthrie was appointed chairman of the graduate department of philosophy at Georgetown University, which made him ex officio the dean of the Graduate School of Arts and Sciences. Later, he also was named the chairman of deans of the university. During his term, the first eleven women were admitted to the graduate school on equal status as men. The president of the university, Lawrence C. Gorman, described this action as initially experimental and as a "wartime concession" that proved successful. Guthrie sought to revitalize the graduate school, and recruited prominent faculty who fled Europe during World War II, especially those in the fields of philosophy and political science.

The reputation and quality of academics in the graduate department of philosophy, which had a separate location and faculty from its undergraduate counterpart, was greatly improved during his term, and it was said that the graduate school "firmly established" itself for the first time. Having succeeded Edward C. Phillips as dean, Guthrie was replaced by Gerard Yates.

Worldwide academic advocacy 
Following the end of World War II, Guthrie became a proponent of making academia a key instrument in securing future world peace by combating ideologies of nationalism, totalitarianism, and scientific racism. To that end, he became a member of the U.S. Commission on Restructuring Education, which met at Princeton University in 1940, alongside British academics, to implement democratic principles in education. He was also a member of the chartering committee of UNESCO, which met in Nice in 1945.

Guthrie supported a proposal by several Catholic intellectuals to create an American academy for Catholic thought. This occurred in the context of many American think tanks and intellectual organizations, such as the Council on Foreign Relations, reevaluating their purposes and missions, so as to ensure that another world war would never happen again. The body's twofold mission would be "reconstructing Catholic intellectual life" in the aftermath of the war, and maintaining a "presence in the total work of the United Nations Educational and Scientific Organization." Guthrie envisioned the organization as being composed primarily of academic laymen, rather than clergy. Eventually, the academy came to fruition, and he became a co-founder of the Catholic Commission on Intellectual and Cultural Affairs (CCICA) in 1946. He was also a member of the American Academy of Political and Social Science and the Medieval Academy of America.

Guthrie was a prolific traveller, visiting every continent except Australia. He traveled as an exchange specialist with the U.S. Department of State and the United States Information Agency to the Iberian Peninsula and Latin America from 1947 to 1950. He was a polyglot, being fluent in four languages and able to read in four more. Guthrie received the Grand Cross of the Order of Civil Merit of Spain in 1948 for his writings on the Spanish philosopher Francisco Suárez, and lectures at the University of Barcelona, University of Madrid, and University of Salamanca. He received the Freedoms Foundation Award in 1950, the National Order of Honour and Merit of Haiti in 1954, and the Air University Award in 1958 for casting a tie-breaking vote to create the Air University. Film director Samuel Bronston consulted with Guthrie in the 1950s on films set in Ancient Greece and Rome.

Presidency 

On February 18, 1949, Guthrie was appointed to succeed Gorman as the president of Georgetown University. Under his leadership, McDonough Gymnasium was built, with construction starting in 1950, and the building opening in December 1951. One of Guthrie's first actions was the revival of the board of regents in April 1949, whose purpose was to advise the president and participate in fundraising and promotion of the university. Another of his primary goals was to centralize the university administration under the office of the president. At the time he took office, the schools of medicine, law, and foreign service operated close to autonomously in their governance, finances, and academics.

Much of Guthrie's philosophy of education was motivated by his support for scholasticism. He wrote against the modern conception of academic freedom as a "false liberty to license" that deprived students of the "divine dimension of reality". In this view, university-level education should teach students of the divine revelation. At the same time, he advocated for the sort of classical education that existed in antiquity, although supplemented by modern science. In sum, he believed that modern thought had little to offer.

Guthrie's presidency came to an end abruptly in 1952. In the summer of that year, he left for the American West for a retreat and to fundraise. He did not return at the start of the academic year, prompting many rumors on campus. He submitted his resignation to the university board of directors the following October, and it was announced that the Jesuit authorities in Rome had selected Edward B. Bunn as his successor. One historian later determined that Guthrie's ousting was not entirely voluntary, but rather was due to a combination of factors. In July 1952, his health had begun to deteriorate; he moved in with his mother in Annapolis, Maryland, and soon thereafter was treated at hospitals in Baltimore, Maryland and Charlotte, North Carolina. Additionally, he had become frustrated with the fact that each of the university professional schools was headed by a Jesuit regent. They vigorously opposed his attempts to centralize the administration of the university, and when Guthrie tried to invoke the authorities in Rome to support his effort, he felt that he did not have their backing.

Abolition of football 

One major decision of Guthrie's presidency was to discontinue Georgetown's football program in 1951. He offered multiple reasons for his decision, the first of which was that the sport contributed little to the educational purpose of the university and was unbecoming of a Catholic educational institution. Financial considerations also motivated Guthrie. He disapproved that collegiate football had become "big business." The sport consumed the vast majority of the university's entire sports budget, and, combined with ancillary costs of running the program, resulted in a substantial, annual net deficit. Moreover, the team had been performing poorly for many seasons. As a result, Georgetown became the most prominent of 38 schools—many of them Catholic—to drop their football programs by 1951, and the university saw a gradual de-emphasis of sports in general. Guthrie's decision prompted a strong backlash from alumni, and the football program was restored 12 years later.

Later years 
Guthrie continued to suffer from the damage tuberculosis had done to his lungs. After spending time recuperating, he became a professor at Saint Joseph's College in Philadelphia in 1953, and for a time, served as chair of the department of philosophy. He was interested in people who learn differently and worked intensively with one student, who he identified as having a learning disability that science later would identify as dyslexia. He also advocated for the creation of a Latin American studies program at Saint Joseph's, which was created in 1960.

Guthrie assumed professor emeritus status at Saint Joseph's in 1969. He died on November 11, 1974, at the Jesuit novitiate of St. Isaac Jogues in Wernersville, Pennsylvania. His body was returned to Georgetown University and was buried in the Jesuit Community Cemetery.

Writings

Notes

References

Citations

Sources

External links

Audio recordings 
 J. Hunter Guthrie's inauguration as president of Georgetown University: 
 1952 commencement at Georgetown University, with remarks by Guthrie: 

1901 births
1974 deaths
20th-century American male writers
Jesuit philosophers
20th-century American philosophers
Philosophers from New York (state)
20th-century American Jesuits
Clergy from New York City
Fordham Preparatory School alumni
St. Andrew-on-Hudson alumni
Boston College School of Theology and Ministry alumni
Woodstock College alumni
Pontifical Gregorian University alumni
University of Paris alumni
Academic staff of Ateneo de Manila University
Fordham University faculty
Georgetown University faculty
Saint Joseph's University faculty
Presidents of Georgetown University
Grand Cross of the Order of Civil Merit
Burials at the Jesuit Community Cemetery
20th-century American writers
Deans of the Georgetown University Graduate School of Arts and Sciences
20th-century American academics